Snijders Blok-Campeau syndrome is a genetic disorder caused by mutations in the CHD3 gene. It is characterized by impaired intellectual development, macrocephaly, dysarthria and apraxia of speech, and certain distinctive facial features.

Snijders Blok-Campeau syndrome is typically a de novo mutation which generally occurs during the early embryonic stages of development or during the formation of the parent's reproductive cells. This allows for prenatal diagnosis.

Signs and symptoms 
Snijders Blok-Campeau syndrome almost always comes with both physical and intellectual disabilities. Those with the condition will typically have trouble in the development of speech and language. Around one half typically have some form of macrocephaly, while around one third show signs of autism or similar conditions.

Cause 
The CHD3 gene is required for chromatin remodeling, a process that regulates gene expression. By allowing for the creation of chromatin, the CHD3 gene affects how tightly DNA is packed into chromosomes. A mutation of the CHD3 gene changes the amount of chromatin produced, causing over or underexpression of other genes.

History 
Due to the rarity of the condition, with only approximately 60 cases documented in scientific literature, Snijders Blok-Campeau syndrome was only discovered in 2018 by clinical geneticist Lot Snijders Blok and clinician-scientist Philippe M Campeau. The mutation was first documented in the paper "CHD3 helicase domain mutations cause a neurodevelopmental syndrome with macrocephaly and impaired speech and language".

References 

Genetic diseases and disorders
Genetics
Syndromes with intellectual disability
Developmental disabilities
Diseases and disorders
Syndromes
Syndromes affecting head size
Speech disorders
Disorders causing seizures
Disorders of fascia
Disorders of synthesis of DNA, RNA, and proteins
Rare diseases
Rare syndromes